Rodrigo González, (25 December 1950 – 19 September 1985), better known as Rockdrigo or El profeta del nopal ("The Nopal Prophet"), was a Mexican singer-songwriter.  He died at age 35 with his girlfriend, Francoise Bardinet, when the apartment building in which he was living collapsed in the Mexico City earthquake of 19 September 1985. His early death made him a legend in Mexican rock.

Biography
Rodrigo was born in Tampico, Tamaulipas. He studied psychology for a brief time at the Universidad Veracruzana in Xalapa before moving to Mexico City in 1977 with the desire to make music.

He arrived to the capital and began playing in bars and cafés. At first, he survived by singing covers in the streets of the city "in the English style."  Over time, he began to create an oeuvre from his experiences on the streets.

The lyrics of Rockdrigo mixed the urban lifestyle with the troubles of the urban poor, and found many listeners among students. His songs could also be tender, such as "Metro Balderas," the ballad about a man who has lost his lover, and hijacks a subway train. 

In the early 1980s he and other musicians including Rafael Catana, Jaime Lopez, and Roberto Ponce founded the La Liga de Musicos Errantes y Cantantes Rupestres (The League of Wandering Musicians and Prehistoric Cavemen Singers) which became known as the Movimiento Rupestre, a folk music scene that strongly influenced Mexican rock for the next ten years or so. Their music was similar to the Nueva canción movement in protesting social conditions, but unlike Nueva canción, they used street slang in their lyrics, were not overtly political, and drew on U.S. folk music instead of traditional Mexican instruments and sounds. Rockdrigo wrote the manifesto for the group.

In 1983, novelist José Agustín said that Rockdrigo had "achieved what is, for me, an extraordinary accomplishment: making Spanish sound perfect, truly natural in rock'n'roll....From the beginning I thought that Rodrigo González was our version of Bob Dylan with a sense of humor."

At the time of his death, Rockdrigo was living in an apartment in the Unidad Tlatelolco, which was devastated by the 1985 earthquake. After his death musicians would gather at the Metro Balderas station on 19 September to commemorate him and the earthquake and sing his songs.

He was survived by a daughter, Amandititita, who became a cumbia singer and songwriter. In 2011 she and others unveiled a statue of Rockdrigo at the Metro Balderas station.

Music
 
As of 2007 there were four collections of his music:
Hurbanistorias (Urban stories, 1983), a self-made record

Posthumous:
El profeta del nopal (The Nopal Prophet)
No estoy loco (I'm not Crazy)
Aventuras en el DF (Adventures in DF)

Films
 No tuvo tiempo: La Urbanistoria de Rockdrigo González by Rafael Montero
 Un toke de roc by Sergio García Michel
 Por qué no me las prestas? by Sergio García Michel
 ¿Cómo ves? by Paul Leduc

References

1950 births
1985 deaths
Mexican male singer-songwriters
20th-century Mexican poets
20th-century Mexican male writers
Mexican male poets
People from Tampico, Tamaulipas
Deaths in earthquakes
Natural disaster deaths in Mexico
20th-century Mexican male singers